Pedalonina is a genus of moths in the family Sesiidae.

Species
Pedalonina semimarginata Gaede, 1929

References

Sesiidae
Taxa named by Max Gaede
Moth genera